Rakshitta Ravi (born 24 April 2005) is an Indian chess player who holds the FIDE title of Woman International Master (WIM) and 2 Woman Grandmaster Norms.

Personal Life 
Rakshitta was born to Saimeera Ravi and TS Ravi. Both her parents are Indian Chess Players who hold titles, her mother Saimeera is a Women International Master (WIM) and her father is an International Master (IM). She is studying at Velammal Vidyalaya, Chennai. Her father works as a Senior Manager at Indian Oil Corporation Limited. She started playing chess at a very young age and achieved her Woman International Master title at 13.

Career
 Gold Medal at World Under-16 2020 
 Gold Medal at World Under-10 Greece 2015 
 Gold Medal at World Under-8 Blitz Dubai 2013 
 Gold Medal at World School Team Chess Championship Russia in years 2017, 2018 and 2019
 Bronze Medal at World Under-14 Mumbai India 2019
 Silver Medal at Asian Junior Chess Championship Philippines 2022
 Silver Medal at Asian Youth Chess Championship Uzbekistan 2017
 Bronze Medal at Asian Youth Chess Championship South Korea 2015 
 Bronze Medal at Asian Youth Chess Championship Iran 2013 
 Bronze Medal at Asian Youth Chess Championship Sri Lanka 2012
 Bronze Medal at  Commonwealth Under-10 2015 
 Gold at National Junior Chess Championship Pune 2022
 Gold at National Team Chess Championship Ahmedabad 2020 
 Gold Medal at  National Under-9 Chess Championship Pondicherry 2014 

She is a recipient of  'National Child Award for Exceptional Achievements' in 2016 from the then Honorable President of India, Pranab Mukharjee.

References

External links
 New WIM Rakshitta Ravi keeps family flag flying

2005 births
Living people
Indian female chess players
Chess Woman International Masters